"Perdono" (also released under the title "Xdono") is a 2001 song recorded by Italian singer Tiziano Ferro. Released on May 12, 2001, it was the singer's debut single and the lead single from his album Rosso Relativo, which was released four months later. The single achieved huge success in many European countries and even topped the charts in the Netherlands, Spain, Italy, Austria and Belgium (Wallonia).

The song, considered as "sweet and melodious" in its Franco-Italian version, was much aired on radio in France. The music video was directed by Matteo Pellegrini. 

The record producer, Michele Canova, revealed after 21 years that Ferro's song was copied and "lifted and dropped" from a song by American rapper R. Kelly.

Track listings
 CD single
 "Perdono" – 4:04
 "Perdono (English) – 4:04

 CD maxi
 "Perdono" – 3:59
 "Perdono" (English version) – 3:59
 "Perdono" (remix) – 3:43
 "Perdono" (bug version) – 1:45

 CD maxi
 "Xdono" – 3:58
 "Xdono" (remix) – 3:43
 "Xdono" (bug version) – 1:45

Charts

Weekly charts

Year-end charts

Certifications

External links

References

2001 debut singles
2002 singles
Italian-language songs
Ultratop 50 Singles (Wallonia) number-one singles
Number-one singles in Italy
Dutch Top 40 number-one singles
Number-one singles in Spain
Tiziano Ferro songs
Songs written by Tiziano Ferro
2001 songs
EMI Records singles